Khatik Mohalla is a city located in Mathura Cantt, Uttar Pradesh. It is just 2 kilometers from Mathura bus stop. Agra is 61 kilometers to the south east.

References 

Mathura